
Year 364 BC was a year of the pre-Julian Roman calendar. At the time, it was known as the Year of the Consulship of Peticus and Calvus (or, less frequently, year 390 Ab urbe condita). The denomination 364 BC for this year has been used since the early medieval period, when the Anno Domini calendar era became the prevalent method in Europe for naming years.

Events 
 By place 
 Greece 
 On the advice of the city's military leader, Epaminondas, Thebes builds a fleet of 100 triremes to help combat Athens. Thebes destroys its Boeotian rival Orchomenus.
 Philip II of Macedon, brother of the reigning king of Macedonia, returns to his native land after having been held as a hostage in Thebes since 369 BC.
 The army of Thebes under their statesman and general, Pelopidas, defeats Alexander of Pherae in the Battle of Cynoscephalae in Thessaly, but Pelopidas is killed during the battle. As a result of his loss of this battle, Alexander is compelled by Thebes to acknowledge the freedom of the Thessalian cities, to limit his rule to Pherae, and to join the Boeotian League.
 The Spartans under Archidamus III are defeated by the Arcadians at Cromnus.
 The Athenian general, Iphicrates, fails in attempts to recover Amphipolis. Retiring to Thrace, Iphicrates fights for his father-in-law, the Thracian king Cotys I, against Athens for the possession of the Thracian Chersonese. Cotys I is victorious and controls the whole Chersonese peninsula by 359 BC.
 Timophanes, along with a number of colleagues, including his brother Timoleon, takes possession of the acropolis of Corinth and Timophanes makes himself master of the city. Later, Timoleon, after ineffectual protests, tacitly acquiesces to his colleagues putting Timophanes to death for his actions.

 China 
 The Chinese astronomer Gan De from the State of Qi reportedly discovers the moon Ganymede, belonging to Jupiter, and makes the earliest known sunspot observations.

Births

Deaths 
 Pelopidas, Theban statesman (killed in the Battle of Cynoscephalae in Thessaly)

References